Júlíusson or Juliusson may refer to:

Heiðar Geir Júlíusson (born 1987), Icelandic footballer
Jökull Júlíusson (born 1990), Icelandic singer-songwriter, lead singer of Kaleo
Karl Júlíusson, Icelandic-born film production and costume designer who resides in Norway
Kristján Þór Júlíusson (born 1957), Icelandic politician, member of Alþingi, Minister of Fisheries and Agriculture
Ólafur Júlíusson (born 1951), retired Icelandic football midfielder
Rúnar Júlíusson (1945–2008), Icelandic pop singer, music producer and footballer
Sigþór Júlíusson (born 1975), retired Icelandic football defender
Theódór Júlíusson (born 1949), Icelandic actor

See also
Juliussen